Odd Fredriksen (12 February 1921 – 8 November 1985) was a Norwegian footballer. He played in one match for the Norway national football team in 1947.

References

External links
 
 

1921 births
1985 deaths
Norwegian footballers
Norway international footballers
People from Sarpsborg
Association football forwards